is a railway station in the city of Nishio, Aichi, Japan, operated by Meitetsu.

Lines

Station layout
The station has two opposed side platforms with Platform 1 on a passing loop, and connected by a level crossing. The station has automated ticket machines, Manaca automated turnstiles and is unattended.

Platforms

Adjacent stations

Station history
On December 21, 1926, the Nishio Railway merged with the Aichi Electric Railway, which was acquired by the Meitetsu Group on August 1, 1935. It was renamed to its present name on March 1, 1949. The station has been unattended since February 1967.

Passenger statistics
In fiscal 2017, the station was used by an average of 657 passengers daily (boarding passengers only).

Surrounding area
JA Mikawa Fukuchi branch office

See also
 List of Railway Stations in Japan

References

External links

 Official web page 

Railway stations in Japan opened in 1915
Railway stations in Aichi Prefecture
Stations of Nagoya Railroad
Nishio, Aichi